Sonia Anne Primrose Friedman  (born Freedman; born April 1965) is a British West End and Broadway theatre producer. On 27 January 2017, Friedman was named Producer of the Year for the third year running at The Stage Awards, becoming the first person to win the award three times. In 2018, Friedman was featured in "TIME100", Time Magazine 's 100 Most Influential People of 2018 and was named Broadway Briefing's Show Person of the Year. In 2019, Sonia Friedman Productions was ranked The Stage 's most influential theatre producer in The Stage 100.

Early life
Friedman is the youngest daughter of Clair Llewelyn  (née Sims), a concert pianist, and violinist Leonard Freedman (who later changed his name to Friedman), who was leader of the Royal Philharmonic Orchestra under Sir Thomas Beecham and co-founder of many national institutions including the Scottish Chamber Orchestra and Scottish Baroque Ensemble. Her father is from a Russian-Jewish immigrant family, whereas her mother is English. Her older sister is the actress and director Maria Friedman.

Freedman was educated at several schools including St Christopher School, Letchworth, Hertfordshire, and trained as a stage manager at the Central School of Speech and Drama. 

It was after organising a couple of benefits for World Aids Day during the late 1980s (one of which saw over 200 celebrities working as shop assistants in Covent Garden) that she decided to follow a career as a theatre producer.

Career

Theatre producer
After working at the National Theatre between 1988 and 1993 (fulfilling the various roles of stage management, Education Manager, Head of Education and Producer of Mobile Productions and Theatre for Young People), she co-founded the new writing theatre company Out of Joint in 1993 with Max Stafford-Clark. From 1998, Friedman worked as a producer for the Ambassador Theatre Group. She launched her own theatre company, Sonia Friedman Productions, in 2002. Friedman's productions have been nominated for and won numerous Olivier, Tony and other awards. 

At the 2014 Olivier Awards, Sonia Friedman Productions made Olivier Awards history by winning the most awards for any producer and for winning prizes for Best New Play (Chimerica), Best New Musical (The Book of Mormon), Best Play Revival (Ghosts) and Best Musical Revival (Merrily We Roll Along).

In 2017, Friedman won producer of the year at The Stage Awards for a third year (becoming the first person to win the award three times), and was listed as no. 1 on The Stage power list, the second solo female to hold this position in the award's history and becoming the first person to top the list that wasn't a theatre owner.

SFP productions and co-productions received an unprecedented 31 nominations in the 2017 Olivier Awards – including a record-breaking 11 for Harry Potter and the Cursed Child – the most nominated new play in Olivier history. The show went on to win 9 Olivier Awards – the most ever for one production.

In 2018, Friedman was awarded the Equity Services to Theatre Award at the 18th Annual WhatsOnStage Awards, and was featured in Time Magazine's 100 Most Influential People in the World.

In July 2022 it was revealed that Friedman would be developing a play with Stephen Daldry set in the same mythology as hit TV series Stranger Things however whether this play will involve any characters from the TV show has not yet been disclosed.

TV and film producer
In 2015, Sonia Friedman Productions co-produced two television dramas, the BAFTA Nominated The Dresser which aired on BBC Two and directly followed after SFP's partnership with Playground Entertainment on the six-part mini-series adaptation of Dame Hilary Mantel's Wolf Hall, which also aired on BBC Two in January 2015 and won two BAFTA Television Awards in 2016.

In 2020, Sonia Friedman Productions partnered with Angelica Films to create a sumptuous re-interpretation of Ian Rickson's stage production of Chekhov's Uncle Vanya. The new film version of the production was shown in cinemas ahead of broadcast on the BBC. This made it the first UK stage production closed by the Coronavirus pandemic to have been filmed and produced for the screen. In 2021, Sonia Friedman produced J'Ouvert for BBC Four, a film version of the live theatre production at the Harold Pinter Theatre. 

In 2021, Friedman and Guy Heeley produced Together, multi award-winning writer, Dennis Kelly’s searingly funny and painfully poignant love story, starring BAFTA award-winning and Golden Globe nominated James McAvoy and BAFTA award-winning and Emmy nominated Sharon Horgan, directed by the multi award-winning Stephen Daldry.

Honours
Friedman was appointed Officer of the Order of the British Empire (OBE) in the 2016 Birthday Honours for services to theatre and Commander of the Order of the British Empire (CBE) in the 2023 New Year Honours, also for services to theatre.

Theatre credits

 Accidental Death of an Anarchist (1990)
 Tartuffe (1991)
 The Queen and I (1994)
 The Libertine (1995)
 Shopping and Fucking (1996)
 Blue Kettle / Heart's Desire (1997)
 The Steward of Christendom (1997)
 Three Sisters (1997)
 Spoonface Steinberg (1999)
 Speed the Plow (2000)
 Noises Off (2000)
 A Day in the Death of Joe Egg (2001)
 Benefactors (2002)
 Up For Grabs (2002)
 Afterplay (2002)
 What the Night Is For (2002)
 Macbeth (2002)
 Ragtime (2003)
 A Day in the Death of Joe Egg (2003), on Broadway
 Sexual Perversity in Chicago (2003)
 Absolutely! (Perhaps) (2003)
 Hitchcock Blonde (2003)
 See You Next Tuesday (2003)
 Jumpers (2003)
 Calico (2004)
 Endgame (2004)
 Guantánamo (2004)
 The Woman in White (2004)
 By the Bog of Cats (2005)
 Whose Life is it Anyway (2005)
 The Home Place (2005)
 As You Like It (2005)
 Shoot the Crow (2005)
 Celebration (2005)
 Otherwise Engaged (2005)
 The Woman in White (2005) on Broadway
 Donkeys' Years (2006) 
 On the Third Day (2006)
 Eh Joe (2006)
 Bent (2006)
 Faith Healer (2006), on Broadway; nominated for a Best Revival Tony Award
 Love Song (2006)
 Rock 'n' Roll (2006)
 King of Hearts (2007)
 The Dumb Waiter (2007)
 Boeing-Boeing (2007)
 In Celebration (2007)
 Rock 'n' Roll (2007), on Broadway
 Is He Dead? (2007), on Broadway
 Donkeys' Years (2007)
 Hergé's Adventures of Tintin, a musical version of Tintin in Tibet (2007)
 Dealer's Choice (2007)
 Boeing-Boeing (2008), in Australia
 Boeing-Boeing (2008), on Broadway
 That Face (2008)
 Under the Blue Sky (2008)
 The Seagull (2008), on Broadway
 No Man's Land (2008)
 La Cage Aux Folles (2008)
 Maria Friedman: Re-Arranged (2008)
 Boeing-Boeing (2009), UK tour
 Dancing at Lughnasa (2009)
 A View from the Bridge (2009)
 A Little Night Music (2009)
 The Norman Conquests (2009), on Broadway
 The Mountaintop (2009)
 Arcadia (2009)
 Othello (2009)
 Prick Up Your Ears (2009)
 After Miss Julie (2009), on Broadway
 Legally Blonde (2009)
 A Little Night Music, on Broadway (2009)
 Jerusalem (2010)
 Private Lives (2010)
 The Prisoner of Second Avenue (2010)
 All My Sons (2010)
 A View from the Bridge (2010), on Broadway
 Shirley Valentine and Educating Rita (2010)
 La Bete (2010), and on Broadway
 A Flea in Her Ear (2010)
 La Cage Aux Folles (2010) on Broadway
 The Children's Hour (2011)
 Clybourne Park (2011)
 Arcadia (2011), on Broadway
 Jerusalem (2011), on Broadway
 The Book of Mormon (2011), on Broadway
 Much Ado About Nothing (2011)
 Betrayal (2011)
 Top Girls (2011)
 La Cage Aux Folles (2011–12), US tour 
 The Mountaintop (2011), on Broadway
 Jerusalem (2011–2012)
 Master Class (2012)
 Absent Friends (2012)
 Hay Fever (2012)
 Death of a Salesman (2012), on Broadway
 Nice Work If You Can Get It (2012–2013), on Broadway
 The Sunshine Boys (2012)
 A Chorus of Disapproval (2012–2013)
 Richard the Third (2012–2013)
 Twelfth Night (2012–2013)
 Old Times (2013)
 The Book of Mormon (2013, 2014, 2015, 2016, 2017, 2018)
 Merrily We Roll Along (2013)
 Chimerica (2013)
 The Sunshine Boys (2013), Los Angeles
 Twelfth Night & Richard III (2013), on Broadway
 Mojo (2013)
 Ghosts (2013)
 1984 (2013)
 Shakespeare in Love (2014)
 King Charles III (2014)
 Electra, Frank McGuinness translation (2014)
 Sunny Afternoon (2014)
 The River (2014), on Broadway
 The Nether (2014)
 Ghosts (2013), New York
 Bend It Like Beckham (2015)
 1984 (2015)
 Hamlet (2015)
 Farinelli and The King (2015)
 King Charles III (2015), on Broadway
 A Christmas Carol (2015)
 Funny Girl (2016)
 1984 (2016)
 Harry Potter and the Cursed Child (2016, 2017, 2018)
 Sunny Afternoon UK Tour (2016)
 Nice Fish (2016)
 Dreamgirls (2016, 2017, 2018)
 The Glass Menagerie (2017)
 Travesties (2017)
 Funny Girl UK Tour (2017)
 Who's Afraid of Virginia Woolf? (2017)
 The Ferryman (2017), at Royal Court Theatre
 Our Ladies of Perpetual Succour (2017)
 The Ferryman (2017, 2018), at Gielgud Theatre
 Hamlet (2017), at Harold Pinter Theatre
 1984 (2017), New York
 Ink (2017/2018), at Duke of York's Theatre
 Farinelli and the King (2017, 2018), in New York
 The Birthday Party (2018), at Harold Pinter Theatre
 Mean Girls (2018), in New York
 Travesties  (2018), in New York
 Harry Potter and the Cursed Child (2018) in New York
  Harry Potter and the Cursed Child (2019) in Melbourne 
 The Ferryman (2018), at Bernard B. Jacobs Theatre in  New York
 The Jungle (2018), at Playhouse Theatre
 Consent (2018), at the Harold Pinter Theatre 
 The Inheritance (2018), at the Noel Coward
 Summer and Smoke (2018), at Duke of York's Theatre
 The Jungle (2018), at St. Ann's Warehouse, New York
 All About Eve (2019), at the Noel Coward
 Fiddler on the Roof (2019), at The Playhouse Theatre
 Rosmersholm (2019), at Duke of York's Theatre
 The Jungle (2019), at San Francisco's Curran
 Harry Potter and the Cursed Child (2019) in San Francisco
 The Book of Mormon (2019-2020), UK & European tour
 The Inheritance (2019), at Ethel Barrymore Theater, New York
 Harry Potter and the Cursed Child (2020) in Hamburg
 Uncle Vanya (2020), at Harold Pinter Theatre
 Leopoldstadt (2020), at Harold Pinter Theatre
 Dreamgirls UK Tour from 2021
 The Comeback (2020), at Noel Coward Theatre
 Walden (2021), RE:EMERGE Season at Harold Pinter Theatre
 J'Ouvert (2021), RE:EMERGE Season at Harold Pinter Theatre
 Anna X (2021), RE:EMERGE Season at Harold Pinter Theatre
 The Shark is Broken (2021), at The Ambassadors Theatre
 To Kill a Mockingbird (2022), at Gielgud Theatre
 Jerusalem (2022), at Apollo Theatre
 Harry Potter and the Cursed Child (2022) in Toronto
 Harry Potter and the Cursed Child (2023) in Tokyo, Japan
 Oklahoma! (2022) at the Young Vic Theatre 
 The 47th (2022) at The Old Vic 
 Meangirls (2022) US Tour
 Jerusalem (2022) at the Apollo Theatre 
 Funny Girl (2022) on Broadway 
 Merrily We Roll Along (2022) at The New York Theatre Workshop
 Hamlet (2022) at Park Avenue Armory 
 Oresteia (2022) at Park Avenue Armory 
 Eureka Day (2022) at The Old Vic
 The Piano Lesson (2022) at St James Theatre 
 Leopoldstadt (2022) at Longacre Theatre
 Oklahoma! (2023) at Wyndham's Theatre 
 Patriots (2023) at Noël Coward Theatre
 New York, New York (2023) at St James Theatre

TV and film credits
 Wolf Hall (2015)
 The Dresser (2015)
 King Lear (2018)
 Uncle Vanya (2020)
 J'Ouvert (2021)
 Together (2021)

Awards
Following is a selection of the awards won by Sonia Friedman and SFP's productions or co-productions.

Olivier Awards

 Leopoldstadt, Best New Play, 2020
 Leopoldstadt, Adrian Scarborough, Best Actor in a Supporting Role, 2020
 Fiddler on the Roof, Best Musical Revival, 2020
 All About Eve, Monica Dolan, Best Actress in a Supporting Role, 2019
 The Inheritance, Best New Play, 2019
 The Inheritance, Stephen Daldry, Best Director, 2019
 The Inheritance, Kyle Soller, Best Actor, 2019
 The Inheritance, Best Lighting Design, 2019
 Summer and Smoke, Best Revival, 2019
 Summer and Smoke, Patsy Ferran, Best Actress, 2019* The Ferryman, Best New Play, 2018
 The Ferryman, Sam Mendes, Best Director, 2018
 The Ferryman, Laura Donnelly, Best Actress, 2018
 Ink, Bertie Carvel, Best Supporting Actor, 2018
 Harry Potter and the Cursed Child, Best New Play, 2017
 Harry Potter and the Cursed Child, John Tiffany, Best Director, 2017
 Harry Potter and the Cursed Child, Jamie Parker, Best Actor, 2017
 Harry Potter and the Cursed Child, Noma Dumezweni, Best Actress in a Supporting Role, 2017
 Harry Potter and the Cursed Child, Anthony Boyle, Best Actor in a Supporting Role, 2017
 Harry Potter and the Cursed Child, Neil Austin, Best Lighting Design, 2017
 Harry Potter and the Cursed Child, Gareth Fry, Best Sound Design, 2017
 Harry Potter and the Cursed Child, Katrina Lindsay, Best Costume Design, 2017
 Harry Potter and the Cursed Child, Christine Jones, Best Set Design, 2017
 Dreamgirls, Amber Riley, Best Actress in a Musical, 2017
 Dreamgirls, Adam J Bernard, Best Actor in a Supporting Role in a Musical, 2017
 Oresteia, Robert Icke, Best Director, 2016
 Sunny Afternoon, Best New Musical, 2015
 Sunny Afternoon, John Dagleish, Best Actor in a Musical, 2015
 Sunny Afternoon, George Maguire, Best Supporting Actor in a Musical, 2015
 Sunny Afternoon, Ray Davis, Outstanding Achievement in Music, 2015
 The Nether, Es Devlin, Best Set Design, 2015  
 King Charles III, Best New Play, 2015
 The Book of Mormon, Best New Musical, 2014
 The Book of Mormon, Gavin Creel, Best Actor in a Musical, 2014
 The Book of Mormon, Stephen Ashfield, Best Performance in a Supporting Role in a Musical, 2014
 The Book of Mormon, Casey Nicholaw, Best Theatre Choreography, 2014
 Chimerica, Best New Play, 2014
 Chimerica, Lyndsey Turner, Best Director, 2014
 Chimerica, Es Devlin, Best Set Design, 2014
 Chimerica, Tim Lutkin and Finn Ross, Best Lighting Design, 2014
 Chimerica, Carolyn Downing, Best Sound Design, 2014
 Ghosts, Best Revival, 2014
 Ghosts, Lesley Manville, Best Actress, 2014
 Ghosts, Jack Lowden, Best Actor in a Supporting Role, 2014
 Merrily We Roll Along, Best Musical Revival, 2014
 Merrily We Roll Along, Gareth Owen, Best Sound Design, 2014
 Legally Blonde, Best New Musical, 2011
 Legally Blonde, Sheridan Smith, Best Actress in a Musical, 2011
 Legally Blonde, Jill Halfpenny, Best Performance in a Supporting Role in a Musical, 2011
 The Mountaintop, Best New Play, 2010
 Jerusalem, Mark Rylance, Best Actor in a Play, 2010
 Jerusalem, Ultz, Best Set Design, 2010
 La Cage Aux Folles, Best Musical Revival, 2009
 La Cage Aux Folles, Douglas Hodge, Best Actor in a Musical, 2009
 Rock 'n' Roll, Rufus Sewell, Best Actor in a Play, 2007
 Woman in White, Mick Potter, Best Sound Design, 2005
 Hitchcock Blonde, William Dudley, Best Set Design, 2004
 Ragtime, Maria Friedman, Best Actress in a Musical, 2004

Tony Awards
 The Inheritance, Best Play, 2020-21
 The Inheritance, Stephen Daldry, Best Direction of a Play, 2020-21
 The Inheritance, Andrew Burnap, Best Performance by an Actor in a Leading Role in a Play, 2020-21
 The Inheritance, Lois Smith, Best Performance by an Actress in a Featured Role in a Play, 2020-21
 The Ferryman, Best Play, 2019
 The Ferryman, Sam Mendes, Best Direction of a Play, 2019
 The Ferryman, Rob Howell, Best Scenic Design of a Play, 2019
 The Ferryman, Rob Howell, Best Costume Design of a Play, 2019
 Ink, Bertie Carvel, Best Performance by an Actor in a Featured Role in a Play, 2019
 Ink, Best Lighting Design of a Play, Neil Austin, 2019
 Harry Potter and the Cursed Child, Best Play, 2018
 Harry Potter and the Cursed Child, John Tiffany, Best Director, 2018
 Harry Potter and the Cursed Child, Katrina Lindsay, Best Costume Design, 2018
 Harry Potter and the Cursed Child, Neil Austin, Best Lighting Design, 2018
 Harry Potter and the Cursed Child, Christine Jones, Best Scenic Design, 2018
 Harry Potter and the Cursed Child, Gareth Fry, Best Sound Design, 2018
 A View from the Bridge, Best Revival of a Play, 2016
 Humans, Best Play, 2016 
 A Raisin in the Sun, Best Revival of a Play, 2014 
 Nice Work If You Can Get It, Judy Kaye, Best Performance by an Actress in a Featured Role in a Musical, 2012
 Nice Work If You Can Get It, Michael McGrath, Best Performance by an Actor in a Featured Role in a Musical, 2012
 Death of a Salesman, Best Revival of a Play, 2012
 Death of a Salesman, Mike Nichols, Best Direction of a Play, 2012
 The Book Of Mormon, Best Musical, 2011
 The Book Of Mormon, Trey Parker, Robert Lopez and Matt Stone, Best Book of a Musical, 2011
 The Book Of Mormon, Trey Parker, Robert Lopez and Matt Stone, Best Original Score, 2011
 The Book Of Mormon, Casey Nicholaw and Trey Parker, Best Direction of a Musical, 2011
 The Book Of Mormon, Larry Hochman & Stephen Oremus, Best Orchestrations, 2011
 The Book Of Mormon, Scott Pask, Best Scenic Design of a Musical, 2011
 The Book Of Mormon, Brian MacDevitt, Best Lighting Design of a Musical, 2011
 The Book Of Mormon, Brian Ronan, Best Sound Design of a Musical, 2011
 The Book Of Mormon, Nikki M. James, Best Performance by an Actress in a Featured Role in a Musical, 2011
 Jerusalem, Mark Rylance, Best Performance by an Actor in a Leading Role in a Play, 2011
 La Cage Aux Folles, Best Revival of a Musical, 2010
 La Cage Aux Folles, Douglas Hodge, Best Performance by a Leading Actor in a Musical, 2010
 La Cage Aux Folles, Terry Johnson, Best Direction of a Musical, 2010
 A Little Night Music, Catherine Zeta-Jones, Best Performance by a Leading Actress in a Musical, 2010
 A View From the Bridge, Scarlett Johansson, Best Performance by a Featured Actress in a Play, 2010
 The Norman Conquests, Best Revival of a Play, 2009
 Boeing-Boeing, Best Revival of a Play, 2008
 Boeing-Boeing, Mark Rylance, Best Performance by a Leading Actor in a Play, 2008
 Faith Healer, Ian McDiarmid, Best Performance by a Featured Actor in a Play, 2006
 Noises Off, Katie Finneran, Best Performance by a Featured Actress in a Play, 2002

Bafta Television Awards
 Drama Series, Together, 2022
 Drama Series, Wolf Hall, 2016
 Leading Actor, Mark Rylance, Wolf Hall, 2016

The Stage Awards
 Producer of the year, Sonia Friedman, 2019
 Producer of the year, Sonia Friedman, 2017
 Producer of the year, Sonia Friedman, 2016
 Producer of the year, Sonia Friedman, 2015

Evening Standard Awards
 Rodgers and Hammerstein's Oklahoma!, Best Musical, 2022
 Rodgers & Hammerstein's Oklahoma!, Patrick Vaill, Best Musical Performance, 2022
 The Inheritance, Best Play, 2018
 The Jungle, Miriam Buether, Best Design, 2018
 The Ferryman, Best Play, 2017
 The Ferryman, Sam Mendes, Best Director, 2017
 The Ferryman, Tom Glynn-Carney, Emerging Talent, 2017
 Dreamgirls, Amber Riley, Best Musical Performance, 2017
 Ink, Best Design, 2017
 Harry Potter and the Cursed Child, Best Play, 2016
 Oresteia, Robert Icke, Best Director, 2015
 All My Sons, Howard Davies, Best Director, 2010
 Jerusalem, Best Play, 2009
 Jerusalem, Mark Rylance, Best Actor, 2009
 Othello, Lenny Henry, Outstanding Newcomer, 2009
 That Face, Polly Stenham, Most Promising Playwright, 2007
 Home Place, Brian Friel, Best Play, 2005

Drama Desk Awards
 The Inheritance, Outstanding Play, 2020
 The Inheritance, Stephen Daldry, Outstanding Director of a Play, 2020
 The Inheritance, Paul Hilton, Outstanding Featured Actor in a Play, 2020
 The Inheritance, Lois Smith, Outstanding Featured Actress in a Play, 2020
 The Inheritance, Paul Arditti and Christopher Reid, Outstanding Sound Design in a Play, 2020
 The Ferryman, Outstanding Play, 2019
 The Ferryman, Sam Mendes, Outstanding Director of a Play, 2019
 The Ferryman, Tom Glynn-Carney, Outstanding Featured Actor in a Play, 2019
 The Ferryman, Nick Powell, Outstanding Sound Design in a Play, 2019
 Harry Potter and the Cursed Child, Outstanding New Broadway Play, 2018
 Harry Potter and the Cursed Child, John Tiffany, Outstanding Director of a Play, 2018
 Harry Potter and the Cursed Child, Christine Jones, Outstanding Set Design, 2018
 Harry Potter and the Cursed Child, Neil Austin, Outstanding Light Design, 2018
 Harry Potter and the Cursed Child, Finn Ross and Ash Woodward, Outstanding Projection Design, 2018
 Harry Potter and the Cursed Child, Gareth Fry, Outstanding Sound Design, 2018
 Nice Work If You Can Get It, Joe DiPietro, Outstanding Book of a Musical, 2012
 Nice Work If You Can Get It, Judy Kaye, Best Performance by an Actress in a Featured Role in a Musical, 2012
 Nice Work If You Can Get It, Michael McGrath, Best Performance by an Actor in a Featured Role in a Musical, 2012
 Death of a Salesman, Outstanding Revival of a Play, 2012
 Death of a Salesman, Mike Nichols, Outstanding Director of a Play, 2012
 The Book of Mormon, Outstanding Musical, 2011
 The Book of Mormon, Casey Nicholaw and Trey Parker, Outstanding Director of a Musical, 2011
 The Book of Mormon, Trey Parker, Robert Lopez and Matt Stone, Outstanding Music, 2011
 The Book of Mormon, Trey Parker, Robert Lopez and Matt Stone, Outstanding Lyrics, 2011
 La Cage aux Folles, Outstanding Revival of a Musical, 2010
 La Cage aux Folles, Douglas Hodge, Outstanding Actor in a Musical, 2010
 La Cage aux Folles, Matthew Wright, Outstanding Costume Design, 2010
 A Little Night Music, Catherine Zeta-Jones, Outstanding Actress in a Musical, 2010
 A View From the Bridge, Outstanding Revival of a Play, 2010
 A View From the Bridge, Liev Schreiber, Outstanding Actor in a Play, 2010
 The Norman Conquests, Outstanding Revival of a Play, 2009
 The Norman Conquests, Matthew Warchus, Outstanding Director, 2009
 The Norman Conquests, Outstanding Ensemble Performance, 2009
 Boeing-Boeing, Outstanding Revival of a Play, 2008
 Boeing-Boeing, Mark Rylance, Outstanding Actor in a Play, 2008
 A Day in the Death of Joe Egg, Eddie Izzard, Outstanding Actor in a Play, 2003

Critics' Circle Awards
 The Inheritance, Best New Play, 2018
 The Inheritance, Best Director, 2018
 The Inheritance, Best Actor, Kyle Soller, 2018
 Summer and Smoke, Best Actress, Patsy Ferran, 2018
 The Ferryman, Best New Play, 2017
 Hamlet, Best Shakespearean Performance, Andrew Scott, 2017
 Harry Potter and the Cursed Child Parts One and Two, Best Director, John Tiffany, 2016
 Harry Potter and the Cursed Child Parts One and Two, Best Designer, Christine Jones, 2016
 Harry Potter and the Cursed Child Parts One and Two, Most Promising Newcomer, Anthony Boyle, 2016 
 Bend It Like Beckham, Best Musical, 2015
 King Charles III, Best New Play, 2014
 Chimerica, Best New Play, 2013
 Merrily We Roll Along, Best Musical, 2012
 All My Sons, Best Actor, David Suchet, 2011
 Clybourne Park, Best New Play, 2011
 Jerusalem, Best New Play, 2010
 Jerusalem, Mark Rylance, Best Actor, 2010
 La Cage Aux Folles, Best Musical, 2009

WhatsOnStage Awards
 Rodgers & Hammerstein's Oklahoma!, Best Musical Revival, 2023
 Rodgers & Hammerstein's Oklahoma!, Joshua Thorson, Best Video Design, 2023
 To Kill A Mockingbird, Gwyneth Keyworth, Best Supporting Performer in a Play, 2023
 The Inheritance, Best New Play, 2019
 The Inheritance, Vanessa Redgrave, Best Supporting Actress in a Play, 2019
 Sonia Friedman, Equity Services to Theatre Award, 2018
 Harry Potter and the Cursed Child, Best West End Show, 2018
 Harry Potter and the Cursed Child, Best Show Poster, 2018
 The Ferryman, Best New Play, 2018
 The Ferryman, Best Direction, 2018
 The Ferryman, Fra Fee, Best Supporting Actor in a Play, 2018
 Hamlet, Best Play Revival, 2018
 Hamlet, Juliet Stevenson, Best Supporting Actress in a Play, 2018
 Harry Potter and the Cursed Child, Best New Play, 2017
 Harry Potter and the Cursed Child, Jamie Parker, Best Actor in a Play, 2017
 Harry Potter and the Cursed Child, Anthony Boyle, Best Supporting Actor in a Play, 2017
 Harry Potter and the Cursed Child, Noma Dumezweni, Best Supporting Actress in a Play, 2017
 Harry Potter and the Cursed Child, John Tiffany, Best Direction, 2017
 Harry Potter and the Cursed Child, Christine Jones, Best Set Design, 2017
 Harry Potter and the Cursed Child, Neil Austin, Best Lighting Design, 2017
 Harry Potter and the Cursed Child, Finn Ross and Ash Woodward, Best Video Design, 2017
 Dreamgirls, Amber Riley, Best Actress in a Musical, 2017
 Funny Girl, Best Musical Revival, 2017
 Hamlet, Best Play Revival, 2016
 Hamlet, Benedict Cumberbatch, Best Actor in a Play, 2016
 Hamlet, Es Devlin, Best Set Design, 2016
 Hamlet, Jane Cox, Best Lighting Design, 2016
 Shakespeare in Love, Best New Play, 2015
 The Book of Mormon, Best New Musical, 2014
 Twelfth Night, Stephen Fry, Best Supporting Actor in a Play, 2013
 Richard III & Twelfth Night, The IMAIL Best Ensemble Performance, 2013
 Twelfth Night, Best Shakespearean Production, 2013
 Much Ado About Nothing, David Tennant and Catherine Tate reuniting on stage, Theatre Event of the Year, 2012
 Much Ado About Nothing, Best Shakespearean Production, 2012
 All My Sons, Zoe Wanamaker, Best Actress in a Play, 2011
 All My Sons, David Suchet, Best Actor in a Play, 2011
 Legally Blonde, Sheridan Smith, Best Actress in a Musical, 2011
 Legally Blonde, Jill Halfpenny, Best Supporting Actress in a Musical, 2011
 Shirley Valentine, Meer Syal, Best Solo Performance, 2011
 Legally Blonde, by Nell Benjamin, Lawrence O’Keefe & Heather Hach, Best New Musical, 2011
 Legally Blonde, Jerry Mitchell, Best Choreographer, 2011
 La Cage Aux Folles, John Barrowman, Best Takeover Role, 2010
 Jerusalem, by Jez Butterworth, Best New Play, 2010
 La Cage Aux Folles, Tracie Bennett, Best Supporting Actress in a Musical, 2009
 Under The Blue Sky, by David Eldridge, Best New Play, 2009
 La Cage Aux Folles, Lynne Page, Best Choreographer, 2009
 The Dumb Waiter, Lee Evans, Best Supporting Actor, 2008
 Rock ‘n’ Roll, by Tom Stoppard, Best New Play, 2007
 Rock ‘n’ Roll, Trevor Nunn, Best Director, 2007
 Otherwise Engaged, Anthony Head, Best Supporting Actor, 2006
 The Woman in White, Michael Ball, Best Takeover Role, 2006
 The Woman in White, Maria Freidman, Best Actress in a Musical, 2005
 The Woman in White, Angela Christian, Best Supporting Actress in a Musical, 2005
 The Woman in White, Michael Crawford, Best Actor in a Musical, 2005
 The Woman in White, Trevor Nunn, Best Director, 2005
 The Woman in White, William Dudley, Best Set Designer, 2005
 What the Night Is For, Gillian Anderson, Best Actress in a Play, 2003
 Up For Grabs, Sian Thomas, Best Supporting Actress in a Play, 2003
 Up For Grabs, Madonna's West End debut, Theatre Event of the Year, 2003
 A Day in the Death of Joe Egg, Victoria Hamilton, Best Actress in a Play, 2002
 A Day in the Death of Joe Egg, Best Play Revival, 2002

South Bank Sky Arts Awards
 Uncle Vanya, 2021
 The Inheritance, 2019
 The Jungle, 2018
 Harry Potter and the Cursed Child, 2017
 King Charles III, 2015

Outer Critics Circle Awards
 The Inheritance, Outstanding New Broadway Play, 2020 (Honours)
 The Inheritance, Stephen Daldry, Outstanding Director of a Play, 2020 (Honours)
 The Inheritance, John Benjamin Hickey, Outstanding Featured Actor in a Play, 2020 (Honours)
 The Inheritance, Paul Hilton, Outstanding Featured Actor in a Play, 2020 (Honours)
 The Inheritance, Samuel H. Levine, Outstanding Featured Actor in a Play, 2020 (Honours)
 The Inheritance, Lois Smith, Outstanding Featured Actress in a Play, 2020 (Honours)
 The Ferryman, Outstanding New Broadway Play, 2019
 The Ferryman, Sam Mendes, Outstanding Director of a Play, 2019
 Harry Potter and the Cursed Child, Outstanding New Broadway Play, 2018
 Harry Potter and the Cursed Child, John Tiffany, Outstanding Director of a Play, 2018
 Harry Potter and the Cursed Child, Christine Jones, Outstanding Scenic Design, 2018
 Harry Potter and the Cursed Child, Neil Austin, Outstanding Lighting Design, 2018
 Harry Potter and the Cursed Child, Finn Ross & Ash Woodward, Outstanding Projection Design, 2018
 Harry Potter and the Cursed Child, Gareth Fry, Outstanding Sound Design, 2018
 Mean Girls, Tina Fey, Outstanding Book of a Musical, 2018

New York Drama Critics' Circle Awards
 The Ferryman, Best Play, 2019

Drama League Awards
 The Inheritance, Outstanding Production of a Play, 2020
 The Ferryman, Outstanding Production of a Broadway or Off-Broadway Play, 2019
 Harry Potter and the Cursed Child, Outstanding Production of a Broadway or Off-Broadway Play, 2018

 Personal life 
She is the younger sister of director/actress/singer Maria Friedman, violinist Richard Friedman and Dr Sarah Beecham. Her younger (half) brother, Ben, is a television director (his credits include being Director / Producer of The Great British Bake Off''). Sonia lives with the writer Joe Murphy in their East End pub and they have two dogs.

References

External links
 Sonia Friedman Productions
 Out of Joint Theatre
 
 
 
 
 Olivier Awards

1965 births
Living people
English Jews
English people of Russian-Jewish descent
Alumni of the Royal Central School of Speech and Drama
British theatre managers and producers
Women theatre managers and producers
People educated at St Christopher School, Letchworth
Commanders of the Order of the British Empire